Field Marshal Douglas Haig, 1st Earl Haig,  (19 June 1861 – 29 January 1928) was a senior officer of the British Army. During the First World War he commanded the British Expeditionary Force (BEF) on the Western Front from late 1915 until the end of the war. He was commander during the Battle of the Somme, the Battle of Arras, the Third Battle of Ypres, the German Spring Offensive, and the Hundred Days Offensive.

His military career included service in the War Office, where he was instrumental in the creation of the Territorial Force in 1908. In January 1917 he was promoted to the rank of Field Marshal, subsequently leading the BEF during the final Hundred Days Offensive, when it crossed the Canal du Nord and broke through the Hindenburg line, capturing 188,700 German prisoners. This campaign, in combination with the Kiel mutiny, the Wilhelmshaven mutiny, the proclamation of a republic on 9 November 1918 and civil unrest across Germany, led to the armistice of 11 November 1918. It is considered by some historians to be one of the greatest victories ever achieved by a British-led army.

He gained a favourable reputation during the immediate post-war years, with his funeral becoming a day of national mourning. However he also had some prominent contemporary detractors and, beginning in the 1960s, has been widely criticised for his leadership during the First World War. He was nicknamed "Butcher Haig" for the two million British casualties endured under his command. The Canadian War Museum comments: "His epic but costly offensives at the Somme (1916) and Passchendaele (1917) have become nearly synonymous with the carnage and futility of First World War battles."

Major-General John Davidson, one of Haig's biographers, praised Haig's leadership, and since the 1980s many historians have argued that the public hatred with which Haig's name had come to be associated failed to recognise the adoption of new tactics and technologies by forces under his command, the important role played by British forces in the allied victory of 1918, and that high casualties were a consequence of the tactical and strategic realities of the time.

Early life

Haig was born in a house on Charlotte Square, Edinburgh (but with postal address 19 Hope Street, the side street to the south-west; a plaque exists). His father, John Richard Haig, an alcoholic, was said to be "in trade", though as head of the family's successful Haig & Haig whisky distillery, he had an income of £10,000 per year (£1,160,000 in 2018), an enormous amount at the time. His mother, Rachel (daughter of Hugh Veitch of Stewartfield), was from a gentry family fallen into straitened circumstances. Rachel's cousin, Violet Veitch, was mother of the playwright, composer and performer Noël Coward. The family home was Haig House in Windygates, Fife.

Haig's education began in 1869 as a boarder at Mr Bateson's School in Clifton Bank, St Andrews. Later in 1869, he switched to Edinburgh Collegiate School, and then in 1871 to Orwell House, a preparatory school in Warwickshire. He then attended Clifton College. Both of Haig's parents had died by the time he was eighteen.

After a tour of the United States with his brother, Haig studied Political Economy, Ancient History and French Literature at Brasenose College, Oxford, 1880–1883. He devoted much of his time to socialising – he was a member of the Bullingdon Club – and equestrian sports. He was one of the best young horsemen at Oxford and quickly found his way into the University polo team. While an undergraduate he was initiated as a Freemason in Elgin’s Lodge at Leven No. 91 at Leven, Fife, taking the first and second degrees of Freemasonry. In 1920 the Earl of Eglinton encouraged Haig to complete his Masonic progression, and he returned to his lodge to take the third degree, subsequently serving as Worshipful Master of the lodge from 1925 to 1926. He became an officer of the Grand Lodge of Scotland.

Although he passed his final exam at Oxford (a requirement for university applicants to Sandhurst), he was not eligible for a degree as he had missed a term's residence owing to illness, and if he had stayed for longer he would have been above the age limit (23) to begin officer training at the Royal Military College at Sandhurst, which he entered in January 1884. Because he had been to university, Haig was considerably older than most of his class at Sandhurst. He was Senior Under-Officer, was awarded the Anson Sword and passed out first in the order of merit. He was commissioned as a lieutenant into the 7th (Queen's Own) Hussars on 7 February 1885.

Career

Junior officer
Early in his military career, Haig played polo for England on a tour of the United States (August 1886). He would remain a polo enthusiast all his life, serving as Chairman of the Hurlingham Polo Committee from its reorganization in May 1914 until 1922. He would also be President of the Army Polo Committee and founder of the Indian Polo Association.

Haig then saw overseas service in India (sent out November 1886), where he was appointed the regiment's adjutant in 1888. He was something of a disciplinarian, but also impressed his superiors by his administrative skill and analysis of recent training exercises. He was promoted to captain on 23 January 1891.

Haig left India in November 1892 to prepare for the entrance exam for the Staff College, Camberley, which he sat in June 1893. Although he was placed in the top 28 candidates (the number of places awarded by exam) he was not awarded a place as he had narrowly failed the compulsory mathematics paper. He concealed this failure for the rest of his life and later (circa 1910) recommended dropping the mathematics paper as a requirement. The Adjutant-General Sir Redvers Buller refused to award Haig one of the four nominated places, citing his colour blindness, despite Haig having his eyesight rechecked by a German oculist and despite Haig's glowing testimonials from various senior officers, some of them lobbied by Haig and his sister. It has been postulated that Buller was looking for a rationale (colour blindness, the mathematics exam) in order to give a place to an infantry officer.

Haig returned briefly to India (taking time on his way to write a forty-page report on French cavalry manoeuvres in Touraine) as second-in-command of the squadron which he had himself commanded in 1892, then returned to the United Kingdom as Aide-de-camp to Sir Keith Fraser, Inspector General of Cavalry. Fraser was one of those who had lobbied for Haig to enter the Staff College, and he was finally nominated in late 1894, a common practice in the day for promising candidates. While waiting to take up his place, he travelled to Germany to report on cavalry manoeuvres there, and also served as staff officer to Colonel John French (whom he had met in November 1891 whilst French was Commanding Officer of the 19th Hussars) on manoeuvres. The careers of French and Haig were to be entwined for the next twenty-five years, and Haig helped French write the cavalry drillbook, published 1896.

Haig entered Staff College, Camberley in 1896, where he was apparently not popular with his peer group. For example, they chose Allenby as Master of the Drag Hunt, despite Haig being the better rider. Haig impressed the Chief Instructor, Lt-Col G. F. R. Henderson, and completed the course, leaving in 1897. Some writers (e.g. Travers 1987) have criticised Camberley for its old-fashioned curriculum, which especially influenced Haig, as he was an absorber of doctrine rather than an original thinker. Haig was taught that victory must come from defeating the main enemy army in battle, and that as in Napoleonic warfare, attrition (the "wearing out fight") was merely a prelude to the commitment of reserves for a decisive battlefield victory; traces of this thought can be seen at Loos and the Somme. Great emphasis was placed on morale and mobility, and on Murat's cavalry pursuit after Napoleon's Jena campaign of 1806. Although the American Civil War was studied, the emphasis was on Stonewall Jackson's mobile campaign in the Shenandoah Valley, rather than on the more attritional nature of that war.

Mahdist War, 1898
In early January Haig was picked by Evelyn Wood (by then Adjutant-General) as one of three recent staff college graduates requested by Kitchener for a campaign in the Mahdist War in the Sudan. He may have been picked to keep an eye on Kitchener, as Wood invited him to write to him frankly and in confidence. Haig needed little encouragement to (privately) criticise his superiors – he was especially critical of Kitchener's dictatorial habits. Kitchener's force was Anglo-Egyptian, and Haig was required to formally join the Egyptian Army, most of whose officers were British. The plan had been for him to train and take command of an Egyptian cavalry squadron, but this did not happen as Kitchener did not want a command reshuffle with combat imminent. Unlike many British officers, Haig believed that the Egyptians could make good soldiers if properly trained and led. Still without a formal position but accompanying the cavalry, Haig saw his first action in a skirmish south of Atbara (21 March). In his report to Wood about the skirmish, Haig commented on the lack of British machine guns. While later criticized for his failure to optimize the use of machine guns, Haig made a special trip to Enfield to study the Maxim Gun, and throughout the campaign commented on its worth.

Four days later he was made staff officer of brevet Lieutenant-Colonel Broadwood's cavalry brigade. Haig distinguished himself at his second action, the Battle of Nukheila (6 April) – where he supervised the redeployment of squadrons to protect the rear and then launch a flank attack, as Broadwood was busy in the front line. He was present at the Battle of Atbara (8 April), after which he criticised Kitchener for launching a frontal attack without taking the Dervishes in flank as well. During the latter action Haig risked his life rescuing a wounded Egyptian soldier whilst coming under enemy fire, an act which moved several officers present to believe Haig should receive the Victoria Cross. After Atbara, Kitchener was given reinforcements and Haig received a squadron of his own, which he commanded at Omdurman (in reserve during the battle, then on a flank march into the town afterwards). He was promoted to brevet major on 15 November 1898.

Second Boer War, 1899–1902
Haig returned to the United Kingdom hoping for a position at the War Office, but was instead appointed (May 1899) brigade major to the 1st Cavalry Brigade at Aldershot.

Haig had recently lent £2,500 (in a formal contract with interest) to the Brigade Commander John French to cover his losses from South African mining speculations. The loan allowed French to maintain his commission. Haig was promoted to the substantive rank of major on 26 June 1899.

Haig was soon appointed Deputy Assistant Adjutant-General (September 1899) and then Assistant Adjutant General (i.e. chief staff officer) of French's brigade-sized force as it was sent off to the Boer War. He took part in French's first battle, Elandslaagte (18 October, near Ladysmith). French and Haig were ordered to leave Ladysmith as the four-month siege began, to take charge of the new Cavalry Division arriving from the United Kingdom. The two men escaped on the last train to leave Ladysmith (2 November 1899), lying down as it passed through enemy fire.

As in the Sudan, Haig continued to be sceptical of the importance of artillery, basing his opinions on interviews with enemy prisoners. After Major-General French's Colesberg Operations to protect Cape Colony, Frederick Roberts, newly arrived as Commander-in-Chief, appointed his protégé Colonel the Earl of Erroll, over French's protests, to the job of Assistant Adjutant General of the Cavalry Division, with Haig, who had been promised the job (and the local rank of lieutenant-colonel), as his deputy. Cavalry played a leading role in this stage of the war, including the relief of Kimberley (15 February 1900), which featured a spectacular British cavalry charge at Klip Drift. Haig was briefly (21 February 1900) given command of the 3rd Cavalry Brigade, then made AAG to the Cavalry Division at last after Erroll was moved to a different job. French's Division took part in the capture of Bloemfontein (13 March 1900) and then Pretoria (5 June 1900). Haig privately criticised Roberts for losses to horses (exhaustion and lack of feeding) and men (typhoid) and thought him a "silly old man".

After Roberts had won the conventional war, Kitchener was left in charge of fighting the Boers, who had taken to guerrilla warfare. The Cavalry Division was disbanded (November 1900) and French, with Haig still his chief of staff, was put in charge of an all-arms force policing the Johannesburg area, later trying to capture the Boer leader de Wet around Bloemfontein. In January 1901 Haig was given a column of 2,500 men with the local rank of brigadier-general, patrolling Cape Colony, and chasing Commandant Kritzinger. As was standard policy at that time, Haig's actions included burning farmsteads as part of the scorched earth policies ordered by Lord Kitchener as well as rounding up Boer women and children to be placed in concentration camps. 

Throughout the war Haig's sister, Henrietta, had been lobbying Evelyn Wood for her brother to have command of a cavalry regiment of his own when the war was over. French, probably not wanting to part with a valuable assistant, recommended Herbert Lawrence for the vacant command of the 17th Lancers, but Roberts, now Commander-in-Chief back in Britain, overruled him and gave it to Haig (May 1901). As the 17th Lancers were in South Africa at the time Haig was able to combine that command with that of his own column.

As the war drew to a close Haig had to locate and escort the Boer leader Jan Christiaan Smuts to the peace negotiations at Vereeninging. Haig was mentioned in despatches four times for his service in South Africa (including by Lord Roberts on 31 March 1900, and by Lord Kitchener on 23 June 1902), and appointed a Companion of the Order of the Bath (CB) in November 1900. He was also promoted to the substantive rank of lieutenant colonel on 17 July 1901.

Following the end of the war, Haig left Cape Town with 540 officers and men of the 17th Lancers on the SS German in late September 1902. The regiment was supposed to stay in South Africa but in the end returned home sooner than planned, and arrived at Southampton in late October, when they were posted to Edinburgh. Haig was appointed an Aide-de-Camp to King Edward VII in the October 1902 South Africa Honours list, with the brevet rank of colonel (thus keeping this rank instead of reverting to the substantive lower rank).

Inspector-General of Cavalry, India
Haig continued as the commanding officer of the 17th Lancers until 1903, stationed in Edinburgh. He was then appointed Inspector-General of Cavalry in British India (he would have preferred command of the cavalry brigade at Aldershot, where French was now General Officer Commanding (GOC)), but had first to spend a year on garrison duty at Edinburgh until the previous incumbent completed his term).

Haig's war service had earned him belated but rapid promotion: having been a captain until the relatively advanced age of thirty-seven, by 1904 he had become the youngest major-general in the British Army at that time. He was present at the Rawalpindi Parade 1905 to honour the Prince and Princess of Wales' visit to India. At this time a great deal of the energies of the most senior British generals were taken up with the question of whether cavalry should still be trained to charge with sword and lance (the view of French and Haig) as well as using horses for mobility then fighting dismounted with firearms. Lord Roberts, now Commander-in-Chief of the British Army, warned Kitchener (now Commander-in-Chief, India) to be "very firm with Haig" on this issue (in the event Kitchener was soon distracted, from 1904, by his quarrel with the Viceroy Lord Curzon, who eventually resigned), and wrote that Haig was a "clever, able fellow" who had great influence over Sir John French.

Marriage and children
On leave from India, Haig married Hon Dorothy Maud Vivian (1879–1939) on 11 July 1905 after a whirlwind courtship (she had spotted him for the first time when he was playing polo at Hurlingham two years earlier). She was a daughter of Hussey Vivian, 3rd Baron Vivian and Louisa Duff.

The couple had four children:
 Lady Alexandra Henrietta Louisa Haig (9 March 1907 – 1997); First married to Rear-Admiral Clarence Dinsmore Howard-Johnston, with whom she had three children, including a son Philip, who was a godson of Prince Philip, Duke of Edinburgh. She secondly married in 1954 historian Hugh Trevor-Roper, who was later created Baron Dacre of Glanton.
 Lady Victoria Doris Rachel Haig (7 November 1908 – 1993). Married Colonel Claud Andrew Montagu Douglas Scott on 10 August 1929, with whom she had two children (divorced 1951)
George Alexander Eugene Douglas Haig, 2nd Earl Haig (15 March 1918 – 10 July 2009)
Lady Irene Violet Freesia Janet Augustia Haig (7 October 1919 – 2001); wife of Gavin Astor, 2nd Baron Astor of Hever

Haig had used his leave in 1905 to lobby for a job at the War Office, but the proposal was rejected by H. O. Arnold-Forster the Secretary of State for War as too blatantly relying on royal influence.

War Office
The Boer War had exposed Britain's lack of a general staff and modern reserve army. In the new Liberal Government (December 1905), Richard Haldane, Secretary of State for War, implemented the Esher recommendations accepted in principle by the outgoing Conservative government. In August 1906 Haig was appointed Director of Military Training on the General Staff at the War Office. Haldane later wrote that Haig had "a first rate general staff mind" and "gave invaluable advice" Haig in turn would later dedicate a volume of his despatches to Haldane, who by then had been hounded out of office for alleged pro-German sympathies in 1915. Although both men later claimed that the reforms had been to prepare Britain for continental war, they did not create a continental-sized army and it would be truer to say that they created a small professional army within a budget, with conscription politically impossible despite Lord Roberts' campaigning.

The reforms reorganised the militia, yeomanry and volunteers into the new Territorial Force. Haig was intolerant of what he regarded as old-fashioned opinions and not good at negotiating with strangers. The militia (actually older than the regular army, with many socially important officers) were the last to agree, and had to be turned into a Special Reserve by Act of Parliament. Haig had wanted a reserve of 900,000 men, but Haldane settled for a more realistic 300,000.

Haig's skills at administration and organising training and inspections were better employed in setting up an Expeditionary Force of 120,000 men (6 infantry divisions and 1 cavalry – the force which would be deployed to France in 1914) in 1907. As an intimate of Haldane Haig was able to ensure high priority for cavalry, less for artillery, contrary to the advice of Lord Roberts (now retired as Commander-in-Chief) whose views were no longer very welcome because his campaign for conscription had made life hard for Haldane. Haig's records of his time supervising artillery exercises show little interest in technical matters (aim, range, accuracy etc.).

In November 1907 Haig was moved sideways to Director of Staff Duties. He required commanders to take the staff officers assigned to them (rather than choose their own by patronage) and also assigned staff officers to the new Territorial Army. He supervised publication of "Field Service Regulations", which was later very useful in expanding the BEF in WW1, although it still stressed the importance of cavalry charging with sword and lance as well as fighting dismounted. At this time he was also completing a separate work, "Cavalry Studies" (on which topic Haig's admiring biographer James Marshall-Cornwall later wrote that he was "not … among the prophets"), and devoting much time to cavalry exercises. He was also involved in setting up the Imperial General Staff (larger colonies were to have local sections of the General Staff, with trained staff officers), for which his work was praised by Haldane.

Chief of Staff, India
By 1909 it seemed likely to Haldane and Haig that an Anglo-German War loomed and Haig was at first reluctant to accept appointment as Chief of the General Staff in India. He passed the Director of Staff Duties job to his loyal follower Brigadier-General Kiggell (later Chief of Staff BEF), to whom he wrote with "advice" every fortnight. Haig, who had been knighted for his work at the War Office, was promoted to lieutenant-general in November 1910. In India he had hoped to develop the Indian General Staff as part of the greater Imperial General Staff, and to organise despatch of Indian troops to a future European War. A plan he envisaged for mobilising the Indian army to send to Europe in the event of war there was vetoed by Viceroy Lord Hardinge. In the event an Indian Corps would serve on the Western Front early in the conflict, and Indian troops were also used in comparatively small formations the Middle East.

Aldershot
Haig left India in December 1911, and took up an appointment as General Officer Commanding Aldershot Command (1st & 2nd Divisions and 1st Cavalry Brigade) in March 1912.

In the Army Manoeuvres of 1912 he was decisively beaten by Sir James Grierson despite having the odds in his favour, because of Grierson's superior use of air reconnaissance. At dinner afterwards Haig abandoned his prepared text, and although he wrote that his remarks were "well received", John Charteris recorded that they were "unintelligible and unbearably dull" and that the visiting dignitaries fell asleep. Haig's poor public speaking skills aside, the manoeuvres were thought to have shown the reformed army efficient.

First World War

1914

Outbreak of war

During the Curragh Mutiny (March 1914) Haig urged caution on his chief of staff John Gough, whose brother Hubert Gough (then a cavalry brigadier, later GOC Fifth Army during the First World War) was threatening to resign rather than coerce Ulstermen into a semi-independent Ireland. Haig stressed that the army's duty was to keep the peace and urged his officers not to dabble in politics. Sir John French was forced to resign as CIGS, after having made the error of putting in writing a promise that officers would not be required to coerce Ulster; Haig respected Hubert Gough's principled stand but felt French had allowed himself to be used as a political tool by H. H. Asquith.

Upon the outbreak of war in August 1914, Haig helped organize the British Expeditionary Force (BEF), commanded by Field Marshal Sir John French. As planned, Haig's Aldershot command was formed into I Corps. In a letter to Haldane (4 August), Haig predicted that the war would last for months if not years; Haig wanted Haldane to return to the War Office (Asquith had been holding the job since the resignation of Seeley during the Curragh Affair – it was given to Kitchener) and delay sending the BEF to France until the Territorial Army had been mobilised and incorporated.

Haig attended the War Council (5 August), at which it was decided that it was too dangerous to mobilise forward in France at Maubeuge near the Belgian border, as British mobilisation was running three days behind that of France and Germany (i.e. the BEF might be overrun by the Germans as it formed up). There were no other contingency plans – Haig and Kitchener proposed that the BEF would be better positioned to counter-attack in Amiens. Sir John French suggested landing at Antwerp, which was vetoed by Winston Churchill as the Royal Navy could not guarantee safe passage. A critical biographer writes that Haig was "more clear-sighted than many of his colleagues".

In his much-criticised memoirs 1914, French later claimed that Haig had wanted to postpone sending the BEF, which may be partly true, in view of what Haig had written to Haldane at the time. Haig was so angry at this claim that he asked Cabinet Secretary Maurice Hankey to correct French's "inaccuracies". However Haig also rewrote his diary from this period, possibly to show himself in a better light and French in a poor one. The original manuscript diary for early August does not survive but there is no positive evidence that it was destroyed; and it has been pointed out that it is just as likely that the extant typed version was prepared from dictation or notes now lost. Hankey's notes of the meeting record that Haig suggested delaying or sending smaller forces, but was willing to send forces if France was in danger of defeat or if France wanted them (which it did). Haig predicted that the war would last several years and that an army of a million men, trained by officers and NCOs withdrawn from the BEF, would be needed.

Haig had been appointed aide-de-camp to King George V in February 1914. During a royal inspection of Aldershot (11 August), Haig told the King that he had "grave doubts" about the evenness of French's temper and military knowledge. He later claimed that these doubts had gone back to the Boer War but there appears to have been an element of later embellishment about this; Haig (who had criticised Kitchener, Roberts and others) had in fact praised French during the Boer War and had welcomed his appointment as CIGS in 1911.

Mons to the Marne

Haig crossed over to Le Havre. The BEF landed in France on 14 August and advanced into Belgium, where French took up positions on the left of General Lanrezac's French Fifth Army at Charleroi. Haig was irritated by Sir John French (influenced by Henry Wilson into putting his faith in a French thrust up from the Ardennes) who was only concerned with the three German corps in front of the BEF at Mons and who ignored intelligence reports of German forces streaming westwards from Brussels, threatening an encirclement from the British left. Although II Corps fought off the German attack at Mons on 23 August (the first British encounter with the Germans) the BEF was forced to withdraw after Lanzerac ordered a retreat exposing their right flank as well.

The retreats of I and II Corps had to be conducted separately because of the Mormal Forest. The two corps were supposed to meet at Le Cateau but I Corps under Haig were stopped at Landrecies, leaving a large gap between the two corps. Haig's reactions to his corps' skirmish with German forces at Landrecies (during which Haig led his staff into the street, revolvers drawn, promising to "sell our lives dearly") caused him to send an exaggerated report to French, which caused French to panic. The following day 26 August, Horace Smith-Dorrien's II Corps engaged the enemy in the Battle of Le Cateau, which was unsupported by Haig. This battle slowed the German army's advance. However, a critical biographer writes that too much has been made of the "moment of panic" at Landrecies, and that the  retreat, over a period of 13 days, is a tribute to the "steady and competent leadership" of Haig and Smith-Dorrien.

On 25 August the French commander Joseph Joffre ordered his forces to retreat to the Marne, which compelled the BEF to further withdraw. Haig was irritated by the high-handed behaviour of the French, seizing roads which they had promised for British use and refusing to promise to cover the British right flank. He complained privately of French unreliability and lack of fighting competence, a complaint which he would keep up for the next four years. He wrote to his wife that he wished the British were operating independently from Antwerp, a proposal which he had rejected as "reckless", when Sir John French had made it at the War Council on 4 August.

The retreat caused Sir John French to question the competence of his Allies resulting in further indecision and led to his decision to withdraw the BEF south of the Seine. On 1 September, Lord Kitchener intervened by visiting French and ordering him to re-enter the battle and coordinate with Joffre's forces. The battle to defend Paris began on 5 September and became known as the first Battle of the Marne. Haig had wanted to rest his corps but was happy to resume the offensive when ordered. He drove on his subordinates, including Ivor Maxse, when he thought them lacking in "fighting spirit". Although Sir John French praised Haig's leadership of his corps, Haig was privately contemptuous of French's overconfidence prior to Mons and excessive caution thereafter.

First Battle of Ypres
On 15 October, later than proposed after two weeks of friction between British and French generals, Haig's I Corps was moved to Ypres in Flanders as part of the "Race to the Sea". In the belief that the German northern flank was weak, Haig was ordered to march on Ghent, Bruges and Courtrai in western Belgium but the new German Chief of Staff Falkenhayn was trying to do the opposite and roll up the Allied northern flank. I Corps marched headlong into a thrust westward by fresh German forces and the result was the First Battle of Ypres. German forces, equipped with 250 heavy guns (a large number for this early stage in the war), outnumbered I Corps by two to one and came close to success. At one point Haig mounted his white horse to encourage his men, who were retreating around Gheluvelt, although in the event the town had just been recaptured by a battalion of the Worcesters before Haig's ride. Haig cemented his reputation at this battle and Ypres remained a symbolic piece of ground in later years. Haig was also influenced by the fact that the Germans had called off their offensive when they were on the verge of success, and he drew the lesson that attacks needed to be kept up so long as there was any chance of success.

After a fortnight of intense fighting I Corps had been reduced from 18,000 men to just under 3,000 effectives by 12 November. After six days of bickering between British and French generals, I Corps was relieved by French troops; Haig being very suspicious of the pro-French sympathies of Henry Wilson. Following the success of the First Battle of Ypres, French, who had been ordered by his doctor to rest to relieve the strain on his heart, recommended Haig for immediate promotion to general. Haig travelled to London on French's behalf (23 November) to consult Kitchener about the plan to expand the BEF and reorganise it into two armies.

At this point it was thought that the war would end once the Germans were defeated by the Russians at Lodz and the difficulties of attacking on the Western Front were not yet appreciated. A failed attack by Smith-Dorrien's II Corps on Messines–Wytschaete (14–15 December) was blamed on poor GHQ staff work, and on 18 December, Haig met French, who said he wanted to sack the BEF chief of staff Murray, whose performance had been unsatisfactory throughout the campaign and promote his deputy Henry Wilson. Haig thought that Wilson, besides being too pro-French, had "no military knowledge" and recommended Quarter-Master General "Wully" Robertson for the vacancy. This was also the view of Lord Kitchener, so Robertson received the promotion. Haig received promotion to general on 16 November 1914.

1915

Spring offensives

Like French, Haig wanted to push along the North Sea Coast to Ostend and Zeebrugge but Joffre did not want the British acting so independently. Germany had recently sent eight infantry divisions to the Eastern Front, with twelve newly raised divisions, reducing their net strength in the west from 106 divisions at the time of First Ypres to 98, so French and Joffre, thinking that the war would be won by the summer, agreed that a French offensive in Artois and Champagne, should be accompanied by a British offensive at Neuve-Chapelle to be conducted by Haig, as he trusted him more than Smith-Dorrien, after the latter's failure at Messines in December. At Neuve Chapelle, Haig wanted a quick bombardment and his subordinate Henry Rawlinson (GOC IV Corps), a longer and more methodical one. Shortage of shells meant that only a thirty-five-minute bombardment was possible but the small front of the attack gave it the concentration to succeed.

Haig displayed great interest in the potential of aircraft and met Major Trenchard of the Royal Flying Corps (16 February) to organise photographic air reconnaissance and a map of German lines was obtained; aircraft were also beginning to be used for artillery spotting – signalling to British batteries by Morse – observing enemy troop movements and bombing German rear areas. Four divisions attacked at the Battle of Neuve Chapelle on 10 March and penetrated to a depth of  but no progress was made on subsequent days, as the Germans were able to bring in reinforcements. Casualties were around 12,000 on each side. The Official History later claimed that Neuve Chapelle was to show the French the attacking ability of British troops and that it was the first time the German line had been broken. Rawlinson had wanted to end the offensive after the first day and Haig felt that reserves should have been committed quicker. On Rawlinson's suggestion Haig came close to sacking Major-General Joey Davies (GOC 8th Division) until it was found that Davies had followed Rawlinson's orders; Haig reprimanded Rawlinson but thought him too valuable to sack. This may have made Rawlinson reluctant to stand up to Haig thereafter.

French and Joffre still expected victory by July. Whilst the Germans attacked Smith-Dorrien at the Second Battle of Ypres (April), new Allied offensives were planned by the French at Vimy and by Haig at Aubers Ridge (9 May). It was believed on the British side that the lessons of Neuve Chapelle had been learned – reserves were ready to exploit and mortars were ready to support attackers who had advanced beyond artillery cover – and that this time success would be complete not partial. The attack was less successful than Neuve Chapelle as the forty-minute bombardment (only 516 field guns and 121 heavy guns) was over a wider front and against stronger defences; Haig was still focussed on winning a decisive victory by capturing key ground, rather than amassing firepower to inflict maximum damage on the Germans. Sir John French was satisfied that the attacks had served to take pressure off the French at their request but Haig still felt that German reserves were being exhausted, bringing victory nearer.

Lack of shells at these offensives was, along with Admiral Fisher's resignation over the failed Dardanelles Campaign, a cause of the fall of the Liberal Government (19 May). Haig did not approve of the Northcliffe press attacks on Kitchener, whom he thought a powerful military voice against the folly of civilians like Churchill (despite the fact that Kitchener had played a role in planning the Gallipoli expedition and was an opponent of the strong General Staff which Haig wanted to see). French had been leaking information about the shell shortage to Charles à Court Repington of The Times, whom Haig detested and which he likened to "carrying on with a whore" (possibly a deliberately chosen analogy in view of French's womanising). French also communicated with Conservative leaders and to David Lloyd George who now became Minister of Munitions in the new coalition government.

Haig was asked by Clive Wigram (one of the King's press staff) to smooth relations between French and Kitchener. At Robertson's suggestion, Haig received Kitchener at his HQ (8 July – despite French's attempt to block the meeting), where they shared their concerns about French. The two men met again in London (14 July), whilst Haig was receiving his GCB (awarded on French's recommendation after Neuve Chapelle) from the King, who also complained to him about French. Over lunch with the King and Kitchener, Haig remarked that the best time to sack French would have been after the retreat to the Marne; it was agreed that the men would correspond in confidence and in response to the King's joke that this was inviting Haig to "sneak" like a schoolboy, Kitchener replied that "we are past schoolboy's age".

Haig had long thought French petty, jealous, unbalanced ("like a bottle of soda water … incapable of thinking … and coming to a reasoned decision"), overly quick to meddle in party politics and easily manipulated by Henry Wilson. Haig was increasingly irritated by French's changes of orders and mercurial changes of mood as to the length of the war, which French now expected to last into 1916. Haig still thought Germany might collapse by November, although at the same time he was sending a memo to the War Office recommending that the BEF, now numbering 25 divisions, be equipped with the maximum number of heavy guns, ready for a huge decisive battle, 36 divisions strong in 1916.

Loos

The war was not going well – besides the failure at Cape Helles (landing 25 April), Bulgaria had joined the Central Powers (Serbia was soon overrun) and Italian attacks on the Isonzo had made negligible progress. Allied attacks in the west were needed to take pressure off the Russians, who were being flung out of Poland (after the Fall of Warsaw, 5 August). The original plan was to attack in July. At Joffre's insistence the offensive was planned next to the French Tenth Army at Loos.

Haig inspected the Loos area (24 June) and expressed dissatisfaction with the ground; slag heaps and pit head towers which made good observation points for the Germans. French later did the same and agreed. French and Haig would have preferred to renew the attack at Aubers Ridge. Joffre was not pleased and called another conference (11 July) to urge a British attack on Loos. Haig pushed for Aubers Ridge again (22 July) – French at first agreed until dissuaded by Foch (29 July), who felt that only a British attack at Loos would pull in enough German reserves to allow the French to take Vimy Ridge. French wrote to Joffre saying he was willing to go along with these plans for the sake of Anglo-French cooperation, but then wrote to Joffre again (10 August) suggesting an artillery bombardment with only limited British infantry attacks. This was not what Joffre wanted. Kitchener, who had been invited to tour the French Army (16–19 August) listened sympathetically to Joffre's suggestion that in future Joffre should set the size, dates and objectives of British offensives, although he only agreed for the Loos attack for the moment. Kitchener met with Haig first and then with French. It is unclear exactly why Kitchener and then Haig agreed to go along with Joffre's wishes – possibly the disastrous plight of the Russians, but it may be that a promise that poison gas could be used may have persuaded Haig. Having got their own way, the French then postponed the attack as they picked new attacking ground in Champagne and arranged for extra shelling at Vimy, in both cases because of the very reasons – German-held villages and other obstructions – to which the British generals had objected.

Only 850 guns (110 of them heavy) were available, too few for concentrated bombardment over a frontage far wider than at Neuve Chapelle (in 1915 the Germans had 10,500 guns of which 3,350 were heavy, whilst the British had only around 1,500, not to mention the shortage of ammunition). There was also argument over the placement of the reserve, XI Corps (Haking) with the 21st and 24th Divisions (inexperienced New Army divisions), which Haig wanted close to the front. Despite not originally wanting the offensive, Haig had persuaded himself that decisive victory was possible, and it may be that French wanted to keep control of the reserve to stop them being thrown into battle needlessly. French tried in vain to forbid Haig to discuss his plans with Kitchener (on the grounds that Kitchener might leak them to politicians). Battle began (25 September) after Haig ordered the release of chlorine gas (he had an aide, Alan Fletcher, light a cigarette to test the wind).

The attack failed in the north against the Hohenzollern Redoubt but broke through the German first line in the centre (Loos and Hill 70). The reserves were tired after night marches, to reach the front in secrecy and were not available until 2 pm, but were thrown into battle without success on the second day, although it is not clear that they would have accomplished much if available on the first day, as Haig had wanted.

Haig replaces French
The reserves now became a stick with which to beat French, who by now was talking of making peace before "England was ruined". Haig wrote a detailed letter to Kitchener (29 Sep) claiming "complete"  success on the first day and complaining that the reserves had not been placed as close to the front as agreed (this turned out to be untrue) and that French had not released control of them when requested (he had but delays in communications and traffic control had meant that they were not available until 2 pm). French protested that time for the commitment of reserves had been on the second day; when told of this by Robertson (2 Oct) Haig thought this evidence of French's "unreasoning brain". Haig strengthened his case by reports that captured enemy officers had been astonished at the British failure to exploit the attack and by complaining about the government's foot-dragging at introducing conscription and the commitment of troops to sideshows like Salonika and Suvla Bay (6 August), at a time when the Germans were calling up their 1918 Class early.

The failure of Loos was debated in the British press. Kitchener demanded a report (6 October) and Lord Haldane (a former Cabinet Minister) was sent to France to interview French and Haig. French in turn demanded a report from Haig, in particular his claim to have penetrated the German lines (16 Oct). Haig claimed in his diary that a proposal that he be sent to report on the Gallipoli bridgehead, was shelved because of the imminence of French's removal. Lord Stamfordham, the King's Secretary, telephoned Robertson to ask his opinion of French and Robertson conferred with Haig – who was pushing for Robertson to be appointed Chief of the Imperial General Staff – before giving his opinion. The King also discussed the matter with Haig over dinner on a visit to the front (24 October). Haig again told him that French should have been sacked in August 1914. Four days later the King, whilst inspecting troops, was injured when thrown by one of Haig's horses and had to be evacuated to England on a stretcher, which caused Haig some embarrassment. French was reduced to having his orders releasing the reserves published in The Times (2 November), along with an article by Repington blaming Haig. Haig demanded a correction of French's "inaccuracies" about the availability of the reserve, whereupon French ordered Haig to cease all correspondence on this matter, although he offered to let Haig see the covering letter he was sending to London in his report but French's fate was sealed. Haig met with the Prime Minister, H. H. Asquith on 23 November and Bonar Law (Conservative Leader) the next day. Rumours were rife that French was to be sacked, another reason given for sacking him, was that his shortcomings would become more pronounced with the expansion of the BEF, which would number sixty divisions within two years. Matters had been delayed as Kitchener was away on an inspection tour of the Mediterranean and French was sick in bed. Kitchener returned to London (3 Dec) and at a meeting with Haig that day, told him that he was to recommend to Asquith that Haig replace French.

Haig's appointment as Commander-in-Chief BEF was announced on 10 December and almost simultaneously Robertson became Chief of the Imperial General Staff in London, reporting directly to the Cabinet rather than to the War Secretary. Haig and Robertson hoped that this would be the start of a new and more professional management of the war. Monro was promoted to GOC First Army in Haig's place, not Rawlinson whom Haig would have preferred and for reasons of seniority Haig was forced to accept the weak-willed Launcelot Kiggell, not Butler as chief of staff BEF in succession to Robertson. Haig and French, who seemed ill and short of breath, had a final handover meeting (18 December, the day before the formal change of command), at which Haig agreed that Churchill – recently resigned from the Cabinet and vetoed from command of a brigade – should be given command of a battalion.

1916

Prelude to the Somme

For the first time (2 January) Haig attended church service with George Duncan, who was to have great influence over him. Haig saw himself as God's servant and was keen to have clergymen sent out whose sermons would remind the men that the war dead were martyrs in a just cause.

Robertson and Kitchener (who thought that an offensive starting in March, could bring decisive victory by August and peace by November) wanted to concentrate on the Western Front, unlike many in the Cabinet who preferred Salonika or Mesopotamia. Haig and Robertson were aware that Britain would have to take on more of the offensive burden, as France was beginning to run out of men (and perhaps could not last more than another year at the same level of effort) but thought that the Germans might retreat in the west to shorten their line, so they could concentrate on beating the Russians, who unlike France and Britain might accept a compromise peace. Haig thought that the Germans had already had plenty of "wearing out", that a decisive victory was possible in 1916 and urged Robertson (9 Jan) to recruit more cavalry. Haig's preference was to regain control of the Belgian coast by attacking in Flanders, to bring the coast and the naval bases at Bruges, Zeebrugge and Ostend (a view also held by the Cabinet and Admiralty since 1914) into Allied hands and where the Germans would also suffer great loss if they were reluctant to retreat.

Lloyd George visited Haig at GHQ and afterwards wrote to Haig, to say that he had been impressed by his "grip" and by the "trained thought of a great soldier". Subsequent relations between the two men were not to be so cordial. Haig thought Lloyd George "shifty and unreliable". Haig and Kiggell met Joffre and his chief of staff de Castelnau at Chantilly (14 February). Haig thought that politicians and the public might misunderstand a long period of attrition and thought that only a fortnight of "wearing out", not three months as Joffre had originally wanted, would be needed before the decisive offensive. Arguments continued over the British taking over more front line from the French. Haig had thought that the German troops reported near Verdun were a feint prior to an attack on the British but the Verdun Offensive began on 21 February.

In March 1916 GHQ was moved from Saint-Omer to Montreuil, Pas-de-Calais. The town was close to ports and endowed with a well-developed infrastructure in the form of a military academy. For his residence Haig commandeered Beaurepaire House which was a few kilometres SE of Montreuil.

Haig decided that Verdun had "worn down" the Germans enough and that a decisive victory was possible at once. The Cabinet were less optimistic and Kitchener (like Rawlinson) was also somewhat doubtful and would have preferred smaller and purely attritional attacks but sided with Robertson in telling the Cabinet that the Somme offensive should go ahead. Haig attended a Cabinet meeting in London (15 April) where the politicians were more concerned with the political crisis over the introduction of conscription, which could bring down the government and Haig recorded that Asquith attended the meeting dressed for golf and clearly keen to get away for the weekend.

The French had already insisted on an Anglo-French attack at the Somme, where British and French troops were adjacent, to relieve the pressure on the French Army at Verdun, although the French component of the attack was gradually reduced as reinforcements went to Verdun. Haig wanted to delay until 15 August, to allow for more training and more artillery to be available. When told of this Joffre shouted at Haig that "the French Army would cease to exist" and had to be calmed down with "liberal doses of 1840 brandy". The British refused to agree to French demands for a joint Anglo-French offensive from the Salonika bridgehead. Eventually, perhaps influenced by reports of French troop disturbances at Verdun, Haig agreed to attack on 29 June (later put back until 1 July). This was just in time, as it later turned out that Pétain at Verdun was warning the French government that the "game was up" unless the British attacked.

The government was concerned at the volume of shipping space being used for fodder and wanted to cut the number of cavalry divisions. Haig opposed this, believing that cavalry would still be needed to exploit the imminent victory. The Cabinet were mistaken, as most of the fodder was for the horses, donkeys and mules which the BEF used to move supplies and heavy equipment. Discussing this matter with the King, who thought the war would last until the end of 1917, Haig told him that Germany would collapse by the end of 1916. This round of planning ended with a sharp exchange of letters with the Cabinet, Haig rebuked them for interfering in military matters and declared that "I am responsible for the efficiency of the Armies in France". Lloyd George thought Haig's letter "perfectly insolent" and that the government "had the right to investigate any matter connected with the war that they pleased".

From 1 July to 18 November 1916, Haig directed the British portion of the Battle of the Somme. The French wanted Haig to persist with the offensive and insisted throughout the battle, even after the French went on the offensive at Verdun in October 1916. Although too much shrapnel was used in the initial bombardment for 1 July, Haig was not entirely to blame for this – as early as Jan 1915 Haig had been impressed by evidence of the effectiveness of high explosive shells and had demanded as many of them as possible from van Donop (Head of Ordnance in Britain).

1917

On 1 January 1917, Haig was made a field marshal. The King (George V) wrote him a handwritten note ending: "I hope you will look upon this as a New Year's gift from myself and the country". Lloyd George, who had become Prime Minister in December 1916, infuriated Haig and Robertson by placing the BEF under the command of the new French Commander-in-Chief Robert Nivelle, at a stormy conference at Calais. The failure of the Nivelle Offensive in April 1917 (which Haig had been required to support with a British offensive by the Third and First Armies at Arras) and the subsequent French mutiny and political crisis, discredited Lloyd George's plans for Anglo-French co-operation for the time being. During the second half of 1917, Haig conducted an offensive at Passchendaele (the Third Battle of Ypres). Haig hoped to break through and liberate the North Sea coast of Belgium from which German U-Boats were operating, provided that there was assistance from the French, support from Britain and that Russia stayed in the war.

The Admiralty, led by John Jellicoe, believed that the U-Boat threat could jeopardise Britain's ability to continue fighting into 1918. Another objective was to commit German resources to Belgian Flanders, away from the Aisne sector in France, where the French mutiny had been worst, in order to give the French Army time to recover. In addition to his immediate objectives, Haig was also worried that the Russian Revolution would result in Russia and Germany making peace and forming an alliance. If this happened the million or so German troops located on the Eastern Front would be transferred to the west by late 1917 or early 1918. If this occurred, a decisive victory would be much more difficult to obtain.

The Third Battle of Ypres caused the British far fewer casualties than the Battle of the Somme and the substantial success of the occupation of the ridges around Ypres, the first stage of the offensive strategy and inflicted comparable losses on the Germans, who were far less capable of replacing losses and which contributed to their defeat in 1918. When he asked the Canadian Corps commander, Arthur Currie, to capture Passchendaele Ridge during the final month of the battle, Currie flatly replied "It's suicidal. I will not waste 16,000 good soldiers on such a hopeless objective" and then did as he was told.

Cambrai
By the end of 1917, Lloyd George felt able to assert authority over the generals and at the end of the year was able to sack the First Sea Lord Admiral Jellicoe. Over the objections of Haig and Robertson, an inter-Allied Supreme War Council was set up. En route to a meeting in Paris to discuss this (1 November), Lloyd George told Wilson, Smuts and Hankey that he was toying with the idea of sending Haig to command the British and French forces in Italy. At the meeting (4 November), Lloyd George accused Haig of encouraging press attacks on him. Haig was making similar complaints about Lloyd George, whom he privately compared to the Germans accusing the Allies of atrocities, of which they were guilty. Haig volunteered to write to J. A. Spender, pro-Asquith editor of the Westminster Gazette but Lloyd George begged him not to. Haig wrote "I gave LG a good talking-to on several of the questions that he raised, and felt I got the best of the arguments", a view which does not reflect the later reputations of Haig and Lloyd George.

At the Versailles meeting, when the Supreme War Council was inaugurated (11 November), Lloyd George attributed the success of the Central Powers to unity and scoffed at recent Allied "victories", saying he wished "it had not been necessary to win so many of them". His speech angered several leading politicians, Carson repudiated it and Derby assured Haig of his backing. Haig thought that Lloyd George's political position was weak and he would not last another six weeks (this was a false prediction, although Lloyd George did not have full freedom of action in a coalition government, his personal drive and appeal to certain sections of the public made him indispensable as Prime Minister). Haig and Pétain objected to a common command, arguing that coalitions work better when one power is dominant, which was no longer the case, now that British military power had increased relative to that of France.

Lloyd George got his wish to send British forces to Italy, after the Italian defeat at Caporetto in November. Plumer was moved to Italy with five divisions and heavy artillery, which made renewal of the Ypres offensive impossible. Haig knew that manpower was scarce in the BEF and at home and wrote to Robertson (28 October) that an offensive at Cambrai would stem the flow of reinforcements to Italy; Robertson delayed the despatch of two divisions.

Plans for a III Corps attack at Cambrai had been proposed as far back as May. Haig had informed the War Office (5 June) that "events have proved the utility of Tanks" and had initially (18 July) approved preparations as a deception measure from Passchendaele and approved the operation more formally (13 October) as the First Battle of Passchendaele was being fought. The plan was to trap German troops between the River Sensee and Canal du Nord, with the cavalry to seize the St Quentin Canal crossings, then exploit north-east. The first day objective was the high ground around Bourlon Wood and Haig was to review progress after 48 hours.

The Third Army attacked at Cambrai (6.20 am on 20 November) with six infantry and five cavalry divisions, 1,000 guns (using a surprise predicted barrage rather than a preliminary bombardment) and nine tank battalions of 496 tanks (325 combat, 98 support) on unbroken ground, an area held by two German divisions. On the first day the British penetrated  on a  front with only 4,000 casualties, limited on the first day by blown bridges and the shortness of the November day. The 51st (Highland) Division was held up at Flesquieres village, which fell the following day. Haig's intelligence chief Brigadier-General Charteris, told him that the Germans would not be able to reinforce for 48 hours and James Marshall-Cornwall, then a junior intelligence officer, later an admiring biographer of Haig, alleged that Charteris refused to have reported fresh German divisions shown on the situation map as he did not want to weaken Haig's resolution.

Haig visited the battlefield (21 November), inspecting the fighting at Bourlon Wood through his binoculars. He thought the attacks "feeble and uncoordinated" and was disappointed at the lack of grip by corps and division commanders and encountering 1st Cavalry Division, which had been ordered to fall back, resisted the temptation to countermand the order. At around 9 pm he decided to continue the attack on Bourlon Wood, a decision which has been much criticised but which made good military sense at the time and was supported by Byng, although the political need for a clear victory may also have been a factor. The offensive continued but with diminishing returns. Bourlon Wood fell on 23 November but German counter-attacks had begun. Haig complained that the lack of an extra two divisions had prevented a breakthrough, a view described by one biographer as "self-deception, pure and simple".

Some of the gains (after the church bells had been rung in England in celebration) were retaken after 30 November, when the Germans made their first counter-offensive against the British since 1914, using new Sturmtruppen tactics. GHQ intelligence had failed to piece together warnings, especially those from 55th Division. British casualties had mounted to over 40,000 by 3 December, with German losses somewhat less. Baker-Carr, commanding 1st Tank Brigade, later claimed that Kiggell had proposed cutting the number of tank battalions by 50 percent, as Cambrai was "a splendid show but not one that can ever be repeated". This was not Haig's view. One biographer argues that the initial success at Cambrai helped to save Haig's job but another view is that the ultimate disappointment did more damage to Haig's political credibility than Passchendaele.

Aftermath of Cambrai
Reviewing recent operations at an Army Commanders Conference on 7 December at Doullens, Haig commented how six months earlier, before Messines, the British had expected offensives from Russia, Italy and France and had instead been left carrying the burden. Lloyd George (6 December) was particularly angry at the embarrassing Cambrai reverse, at the hands of "a few" German divisions, after Haig had insisted for the last two years that his offensives were weakening them. When told of this, Haig wrote to Robertson that Lloyd George should either sack him or else cease his "carping criticism". Haig's support amongst the Army, the public and many politicians made this impossible and a plan that Haig be "promoted" to a sinecure, as generalissimo of British forces (similar to what had been done to Joffre at the end of 1916) was scotched when Lord Derby threatened resignation. Asked to provide a statement to the House of Commons, Haig quoted Byng's telephone report to GHQ that the counter-attack had been "in no sense a surprise" (in fact this was contradicted by evidence from GHQ) and attributed the German success to "one cause and one alone … lack of training on the part of junior officers and NCOs and men", a verdict supported by the court of enquiry which, at Derby's instigation, Haig ordered, although the enquiry also criticised "higher commanders" for failing to enforce defensive doctrine. There were also enquiries by a War Office Committee and by General Smuts on behalf of the War Cabinet.

In a later report to Robertson (24 Dec) Haig accepted the blame, stating that the troops had been tired as a result of the attack on Bourlon Wood which he had ordered. Esher had warned Haig (28 October) that Rawlinson was criticising Charteris (known as "the Principal Boy"), and reported that he had told Rawlinson that Charteris had "no influence" over Haig and his information had never let him down. Derby warned Haig (7 December) to sack Charteris, as the War Cabinet and General Staff were displeased at his exaggerated claims of German weakness. Haig took responsibility and defended Charteris. After the battle, the press baron Lord Northcliffe reduced his support of Haig. He had recently been offended on a visit to GHQ, when Haig had been too busy to pay much attention to him. A Times editorial "A Case for Inquiry" (12 Dec) criticised Charteris for his "fatuous estimates" of German losses and morale and called for the sacking of "every blunderer" at GHQ. Haig assumed Lloyd George had inspired the article.

Northcliffe also warned Haig's aide Philip Sassoon that changes were required: "Sir Douglas is regarded with affection in the army, but everywhere people remark that he is surrounded by incompetents". Haig was required to dismiss Charteris. Robertson had arrived at Haig's Headquarters with orders (signed by Derby) for his dismissal in his pocket, in case Haig refused to do as he was asked. Haig claimed to his wife (14 December) that Charteris' work had been excellent but he felt he had to sack him because he had "upset so many people". A common criticism is that Haig only accepted intelligence from Charteris (who told him what he wanted to hear) and did not cross-check it with other intelligence.

1918

Political manoeuvres
Over lunch at 10 Downing Street with Derby and Lloyd George in January (Derby bet a sceptical Lloyd George 100 cigars to 100 cigarettes that the war would be over by the following year), Haig predicted that the war would end within a year because of the "internal state of Germany". Charteris' final intelligence report had deduced that Germany was bringing 32 divisions, ten per month, from the moribund Eastern Front, so the most likely time for a German Offensive was in late March (a correct prediction). Bonar Law asked Haig what he would do if he were a German general: Haig replied that a German offensive would be a "gambler's throw" as Germany had only a million men as reserves and the balance of manpower would shift in favour of the Allies in August (this prediction was also correct) and that if he were a German general he would launch only limited offensives, although he did warn that the German generals might try to keep the civilians out of power by launching an attack to knock out France. Haig left the War Cabinet with the impression that he thought the Germans would launch small attacks on the scale of Cambrai.

Haig also recommended that the British should keep the initiative and draw in German reserves by renewing the offensive around Ypres, a proposal which did not meet with political approval, and besides the logistical infrastructure was not available for a breakout from the Ypres salient. By now Haig's 1917 offensives were being criticised in the press (Lovat Fraser wrote a highly critical article in Northcliffe's Daily Mail on 21 January) and in Parliament, where J.C. Wedgwood MP openly demanded a change of command.

The purge of Haig's staff continued, with the removal of Maxwell (Quartermaster-General) and Lt-Gen Launcelot Kiggell as BEF Chief of Staff. It is possible that Derby was covering Haig's back, advising him to ask for Herbert Lawrence as the new CGS, not General Butler. Lawrence was a much stronger character than Kiggell and having made money in business and having no plans to stay in the Army after the War, was not beholden to Haig. In time the two men made a good team. If Derby had covered Haig's back, Haig was not grateful, likening Derby to "a feather pillow which bears the mark of the last person who sat on him".

In January the Cabinet Minister Jan Christiaan Smuts and the Cabinet Secretary Maurice Hankey, whom Lloyd George had contemplated appointing to Kiggell's job, were sent to France to take discreet soundings among the Army Commanders to see whether any of them were willing to replace Haig – none of them were. The only possibility seemed to be Claud Jacob, GOC II Corps. Hankey formed the opinion that nobody important amongst the British generals thought a major German attack likely.

At the Supreme War Council at Versailles (29 January) Haig and Pétain complained of shortage of troops, but Haig's political credibility was so low that Hankey wrote that they "made asses of themselves". It was agreed that an Allied General Reserve be set up, under Foch with Henry Wilson as his deputy; Haig was reluctant to hand over divisions to the General Reserve. Haig argued against a common command, claiming that it would be "unconstitutional" for him to take orders from a foreign general, and that he did not have the reserves to spare (worrying that they would be shipped off to Turkey but thinking the proposal would take time to become operational) and suggested to Clemenceau (who was suspicious of Foch's ambition to become generalissimo) that he might resign. Milner thought Haig's stance "desperately stupid", although Haig had a point that control of reserves by a committee was not necessarily sensible. Clemenceau attacked Lloyd George's wish to make offensives against Turkey a top priority.

Lloyd George now had his showdown with Robertson. He proposed that the CIGS be reduced to his pre-1915 powers (i.e. reporting to the Secretary of State for War, not direct to the Cabinet) and that the British military representative at the Supreme War Council in Versailles be Deputy CIGS and a member of the Army Council (i.e. empowered to issue orders to Haig). He offered Robertson a choice of remaining as CIGS with reduced powers or else accepting demotion to Deputy CIGS at Versailles – either way, Lloyd George would now have been able to cut him out of the decision-making loop. Derby summoned Haig to London, expecting him to support him in backing Robertson. In a private meeting with Lloyd George, Haig agreed with Robertson's position that the CIGS should himself be the delegate to Versailles, or else that the Versailles delegate be clearly subordinate to the CIGS to preserve unity of command. However, he accepted that the War Cabinet must ultimately make the decision, and according to Lloyd George "put up no fight for Robertson" and was contemptuous of Derby's threats to resign – he persuaded him not to do so after Robertson was pushed out. Haig thought Robertson (who had begun his military career as a private) egotistical, coarse, power-crazed and not "a gentleman" and was unhappy at the way Robertson had allowed divisions to be diverted to other fronts, even though Robertson had in fact fought to keep such diversions to a minimum. Henry Wilson now became CIGS, with Rawlinson as British military representative at Versailles. Although Haig had been suspicious of Henry Wilson, they gradually established a warily respectful relationship, and interactions were socially more smooth than they had been with Robertson.

German Michael offensive
By March 1918 Germany's Western Front armies had been reinforced to a strength of almost 200 divisions by the release of troops from the Eastern Front. With a German offensive clearly imminent, at a meeting in London (14 March), Lloyd George and Bonar Law accused Haig of having said that there would not be a major German offensive (which was not actually what he had said – he had said it would be "a gambler's throw") but agreed to shelve the General Reserve for the time being until enough American troops had arrived.

At this point Haig had 52 divisions in his front line Armies, and another 8 in GHQ reserve, and 3 cavalry divisions. British troops were tired and weakened, and British divisions had been cut in size from 12 battalions to 9. Allied intelligence did not fall for German deceptions that they might attack in Italy or the Balkans, but thought that the main attack might fall in the Cambrai-St Quentin (Third Army) sector.

Haig privately thought the Guards Division "our only reliable reserve".
He has been criticised for writing (2 March) that he "was only afraid that the Enemy would find our front so very strong that he will hesitate to commit his Army to the attack with the almost certainty of losing very heavily", but this in fact referred to the First, Third and Fourth (formerly Second, now renumbered, at Ypres) Army fronts which he had spent a week inspecting, and which were well-defended – Smuts and Hankey had come to the same conclusion in January. Haig thought the Canadians "really fine disciplined soldiers now and so smart and clean" compared to the Australians.

Haig inspected the Fifth Army (7–9 March) and noted widespread concerns, which he shared, at lack of reserves – he released one division from Flanders to the Fifth Army and deployed another, under GHQ control, to its rear. As late as 17 March, Cox, who had replaced Charteris as Intelligence Chief, predicted that the German Offensive was not yet immediately imminent; Haig still believed that a power-struggle between generals and politicians in Germany (in fact the generals were very much in control) would determine if there was any attack. By 20 March deployment of German trench mortars had been reported by deserters, and British artillery began some spoiling fire.

Germany launched an attack, "Michael" (21 March 1918), with 76 divisions and 7,000 guns, a force larger than the entire BEF (German divisions were somewhat smaller than British) and enjoying superiority of 5:1 over the 12 divisions of Hubert Gough's Fifth Army, which were spread thinly over line recently taken over from the French. Haig was initially calm on 21 March, as owing to the communications of the time GHQ was "an information vacuum" where news often took over a day to reach him, and spent much of the day entertaining foreign dignitaries including the US War Secretary. The Third Army retreated as planned from the Flesquieres Salient, freeing up a division. With three-quarters of the 50-mile front under attack, the British troops fought hard and the Germans failed to reach their first day objectives. However, lacking reserves Gough had to retreat behind the Crozat Canal. 22 March saw the Fifth Army retreat to the Somme; Haig still anticipated further German attacks in Champagne or Arras. The Germans did not initially realise the importance of Amiens as an objective.

Haig did not speak to or visit Gough until 23 March. That day Haig arranged for reserves to be sent down from Flanders. Formal orders were issued to the Fifth Army to maintain contact with the Third Army to their north and the French to their south. After initial optimism, Tim Travers has written of "panic" setting in amongst senior officers like Herbert Lawrence and Tavish Davidson at GHQ on 23 March, and there is evidence that a retreat towards the Channel Ports may have been considered.

Doullens
Haig had a GHQ Reserve which was massed in the north, 72 hours' march away, to protect the Channel Ports. The French Commander-in-Chief, Pétain and Haig met on 23 March (4pm), and Pétain stressed the need for Gough's Fifth Army to keep in touch with Pelle's French V Corps on its right. Pétain agreed to place two French armies under Fayolle as a reserve in the Somme valley, but could not agree to Haig's request to send 20 French divisions to Amiens because of the risk of a German attack around Champagne. Amidst mutual suspicion – a French officer recorded Pétain's increasing fears on 22 and 23 March that the British would retreat on the Channel Ports – Pétain was issuing orders to cover Paris as a priority and maintain contact with the British "if possible".

24 March was "probably the most traumatic day (Haig) had endured since" First Ypres in 1914. Half of BEF supplies came into Le Havre, Rouen and Dieppe and passed by train through Amiens, making it a major choke point. Planning that winter had left open the question of whether the BEF would retreat southwest or form "an island" around the Channel Ports (Calais, Boulogne, Dunkirk) through which Haig's armies drew the other half of their supplies. A retreat on the ports does not seem to have been decided until some days after 21 March. Haig remained composed in front of more junior officers.

This is one of the occasions where doubt has been cast on the authenticity of Haig's diary. Haig's handwritten diary of the next meeting (Dury, 24 March at 11 pm) is brief. The typed diary – probably based on notes prepared in April – describes Pétain as "almost unbalanced and most anxious", claiming that after attending a Cabinet meeting in Paris, where he had been ordered to "cover Paris at all costs", he threatened to retreat on Paris, leaving the British right flank uncovered. Tim Travers argues that Pétain said at the meeting that he would only retreat on Paris if Haig retreated on the Channel Ports, and that Major-General Clive reported from the meeting that Pétain had come away satisfied that Haig would not break contact. In a postwar exchange of letters with Haig Pétain denied that he had ordered a retreat on Paris or had threatened Haig that he might, a recollection which Herbert Lawrence appears to have supported. It has been suggested that Haig and Lawrence, on the long drive back to GHQ from their meeting with Pétain may simply have misunderstood his intentions, and that any factual errors in Haig's diary for this period were honest if mistaken recollections.

In the typed diary, Haig also claimed that on returning at 3 am he telegraphed to Wilson (CIGS) and Milner (War Secretary – an error on Haig's part, as Milner did not hold this position until April) to come over to France and ensure the appointment of "Foch or some other determined general who would fight" as Allied Generalissimo. There is no record of the telegram, and Milner and Wilson were in fact already on their way to France at the time. Wilson's diary records that Haig telephoned him at 7 or 8 pm on 24 March, before the meeting with Pétain, and after Haig's evening visit to Third Army, at which he had ordered that Army to maintain contact at all costs with First Army to its north. Travers suggests that Haig had written off both Fifth Army and the link with the French at this point, that he called Henry Wilson over to France to discuss a retreat on the Channel Ports, and that he wanted the 20 French divisions at Amiens not to maintain the link with the French but to cover the British retreat or perhaps to counterattack.

Haig's letter of 25 March, sent via Weygand, asked for 20 French divisions to cover the southern British flank as the BEF fought its way back "covering the Channel Ports". The letter is ambiguous and does not specifically mention a retreat "to" the ports. Sheffield argues that orders to Third Army were not a precursor to retreat but "a means to an end", pointing to orders for, if needs be, a counterattack onto the northern flank of the German attackers, and also argues that although GHQ had a duty to consider contingency plans, unlike in 1940, evacuation was never actually likely.

Wilson's diary for their meeting on 25 March (11am) describes Haig as "cowed" and saying that unless the French sent more help the BEF was beaten and "it would be better to make peace on any terms we could". Wilson claimed that Haig suggested Pétain be appointed Allied generalissimo (which is not consistent with Haig's later claim that Pétain was unwilling to help the British) and that he proposed Foch over Haig's objections.

At the Doullens Conference (26 March), Haig accepted the appointment of Foch to coordinate reserves of all nationalities wherever he saw fit. In his typed diary Haig claimed much of the credit for Foch's appointment and to have insisted that he have wider powers over Pétain than Clemenceau had wanted to grant him. However, the typed version of Haig's diary, although fuller, does not specifically contradict the handwritten original, and it has been suggested that Haig either needed to reconcile himself psychologically to the need to accept a French superior or else was simply letting off steam and wanted to give himself the credit he felt he deserved. Milner, who represented the British government at Doullens, recorded that Clemenceau was unhappy with Pétain's recent efforts, but claimed that he himself had persuaded Haig to accept the appointment of Foch; Haig's official biographer Duff Cooper gave Haig the credit but commented that the idea had probably occurred to several participants simultaneously. Wilson recorded that Haig seemed "10 years younger" that evening after Doullens.

After a German offensive near Arras ("Mars", 9 German divisions, 28 March) was beaten back, between 29 and 31 March the Germans pushed on Amiens. A Canadian brigade took part in an action at Moreuil Wood. Attacks on 4 April (Villers-Bretonneux, east of Amiens) and 5 April on the Third Army front were beaten back by British and Australian forces, although contingency plans were still being prepared to cover Rouen and Le Havre in case Amiens fell.

German Georgette offensive

Lloyd George demanded Haig sack Gough, and when Haig was reluctant he was given a direct order to do so by Derby (4 April). Haig recommended Cavan for the vacancy (it went to Rawlinson), and offered to resign. Lloyd George wanted to accept Haig's resignation and read out his offer to a meeting of the War Cabinet called (8 April) to discuss "the desirability of getting rid of Haig", but the other ministers, and Henry Wilson, thought there was no obvious successor (Hankey thought the only possibility was Plumer who was "about as stupid as Haig himself"). Rumours were rife in GHQ that Haig would soon be dismissed in favour of Robertson, Wilson (who may have been a prime mover for Haig's dismissal), or more likely Plumer, Byng or Allenby.

During the second major German offensive, "Georgette" in Flanders (9 April), Haig issued his famous order (11 April) that his men must carry on fighting "With Our Backs to the Wall and believing in the Justice of our Cause" to protect "The safety of our homes and the Freedom of mankind" – the latter being a real concern after recent British propaganda dwelled on the harsh terms imposed on Russia at Brest-Litovsk. Just as "Michael" had swept over the Cambrai and the Somme battlefields, won at such cost by Haig's own offensives in previous years, this one swept over Passchendaele although not Ypres itself. The offensive threatened Hazebrouck, "the Amiens of the north", a key railhead through which supplies were brought from the Channel Ports – had it fallen the Channel Ports might have been at risk and Plumer's Second Army might have been cut off.

Foch had earlier refused to send 4 French divisions to Flanders but now redeployed Maistre's Tenth French Army to the Somme sector, freeing up British forces. At Beauvais (3 April) Foch had been given power of "strategic direction", although his powers were still largely based on persuasion rather than command and he was given the title of Generalissimo (he would have preferred "Commander-in-Chief") (14 April) to give him more clout over Pétain, who was still reluctant to release French reserves. Eventually, later in the year, Pétain would simply be placed under Foch's command, although Haig and Pershing retained their right of appeal to their own governments. During a renewed attack (17 April) Foch drew attention to the valour of the British at First Ypres and refused to send further French reinforcements so as to keep a strategic reserve. 24 April saw a further unsuccessful German attack at Villers-Bretonneux near Amiens, featuring the first tank-to-tank combat. Haig was suspicious of Foch's request to move British divisions to the French sector to free up French reserves, worrying that this might lead to "a permanent Amalgam" of French and British forces. Milner agreed but at a meeting on 27 April meeting the dispute was smoothed over, and British IX Corps moved to the French sector. On 30 April Ludendorff called a halt to the Flanders offensive.

Although some American divisions were now serving with the British forces, Haig thought Pershing "very obstinate and stupid" for refusing to integrate US troops (1 May) with Allied units (an ironic complaint in view of his reluctance to integrate British troops with French). At Abbeville (2 May) it was agreed that in the event of renewed attack British forces would retreat south if necessary and abandon the Channel Ports rather than lose touch with the French. Contingency plans were made (11 May) although it is unclear that they would ever have been executed.

The near-debacle of March 1918 was an object of political controversy. Repington wrote that it was "the worst defeat in the history of the Army". Bonar Law claimed in a House of Commons debate (23 April) that Haig and Pétain had agreed the extension of the British line, which was not wholly true as in January 1918 the Supreme War Council had ordered a longer extension than Haig and Pétain had agreed between themselves in December 1917, only leaving them to sort out the details. Lloyd George was accused (in the Maurice Debate of 9 May 1918 in the House of Commons, after Maurice's public accusation three days earlier) of having hoarded troops in the UK to make it harder for Haig to launch offensives. Lloyd George misled the House of Commons in claiming that Haig's forces were stronger (1.75 million men) at the start of 1918 than they had been a year earlier (1.5 million men) – in fact the increase was caused by an increase of 335,000 in the number of labourers (Chinese, Indians and black South Africans), and Haig had fewer combat infantry (630,000, down from 900,000 a year earlier), holding a longer stretch of front (the rest of Haig's men would have been tank, air and artillery crews and above all logistical support personnel). Haig had opposed Maurice in taking his concerns into public, but was disappointed at how Lloyd George was able to get off the hook with a "claptrap speech". Maurice believed he had saved Haig from dismissal.

German Bluecher offensive
By late spring the BEF had taken just over 300,000 casualties. Battalions had had to be brought in from the Middle East. Haig spent time touring his forces in May. Haig's wife reported rumours (11 May) that he was to be brought home as Commander-in-Chief, Home Forces; when Wilson denied the rumours to Haig's face, Haig recorded (20 May) that "no one has been chosen yet!" to replace him.

A third major German offensive against the French on the Aisne ("Bluecher"), starting on 27 May, overwhelmed Hamilton-Gordon's IX British Corps which had been sent there to refit after being involved in "Michael" and "Georgette". At a conference at Versailles (1 June) there was friction between Haig, who was worried that the Germans would attack his sector again (intelligence reported extra German hospital spaces being made available near La Bassee) – this was indeed the German plan but the offensive in question, "Hagen", was repeatedly postponed and never actually took place – and Foch, who demanded that the US divisions trained by the British be moved to his sector to release French divisions (of whose fighting ability Haig was privately scornful) – Foch also accused Lloyd George of withholding British troops in the UK. Foch moved French forces down from Flanders, but there was further friction at a meeting in Paris about Foch's request to move British reserves south (7 June). Haig threatened to appeal to the British Government if he felt Foch was demanding too many British troops, so it was agreed that Haig and Foch should meet more frequently, and in time they developed a good working relationship (although wags at GHQ said he had to fight "Boche, Foch and Loygeorges").

Cooperation improved when the Germans launched their "Gneisenau" Offensive on 9 June, to widen the "Bluecher" salient westwards. Lloyd George and Milner gave their full support to Foch on moving four British divisions. They told Haig that he should consider himself subordinate to Foch for the time being and that they were no longer interested in sacking him (this may have been untrue – as late as August, on the eve of the battle of Amiens, Lloyd George may have been trying to replace Haig with Cavan).

With another German attack imminent, Herbert Lawrence was asked (12–13 July – Haig was on leave in England) to send 8 Divisions – he sent only 2 (XXII Corps). Haig thought this was breaching an agreement of 1 July that covering Paris and the Somme area was to take priority. Wilson consulted the War Cabinet then (in the small hours of 15 July) told Haig to "exercise his judgement" about holding the British line. Haig felt that they would take credit for Foch's victory but might dismiss him if disaster befell the British forces. The German "Peace Offensive" began against the French at Rheims on the same day. Haig eventually agreed that the French could use XXII Corps if necessary "for exploitation".

The Turn of the Tide and the Hundred Days

The "Peace Offensive" turned out to be the last German throw of the dice. "Hagen" was finally cancelled, and in July and August the Germans were defeated, by Allied forces at the Second Battle of the Marne, and by Rawlinson's Fourth Army (British Australian and Canadian Corps) at Amiens. The latter victory, enjoying complete air and artillery superiority and using over 500 tanks, was described by General Erich Ludendorff as "The Black Day of the German Army" after mass surrenders of German troops. On 11 August Haig, contrary to the wishes of Marshal Foch, insisted on a halt to the Amiens offensive (rather than engage new German troops with tired Allied ones who had outrun much of their artillery cover) and launched a new attack by Byng's Third Army on 21 August between the Scarpe and the Ancre. As with his previous offensives in 1916 and 1917, Haig encouraged his subordinates to aim for ambitious objectives, in this case a thrust from Albert to Bapaume, and this time with more success than in previous years, and more than the government were expecting: on 21 August Haig was visited by Winston Churchill, Minister of Munitions, who told him that new equipment (tanks, guns, new poison gases etc.) was being produced ready for what the government expected to be the war-winning offensive in July 1919. On 10 September Haig, on a brief visit to London, insisted that the war could end that year and asked Lord Milner (Secretary of State for War) to send all available able-bodied men and transportation. Milner afterwards shared with Wilson his scepticism and his concerns that Haig would embark on "another Passchendaele".

Haig's forces continued to enjoy much success, but when they began to advance towards the Hindenburg Line Haig received a supposedly "personal" telegram from the CIGS Henry Wilson (31 August), warning him that he was not to take unnecessary losses in storming these fortifications. Haig, surmising that the War Cabinet were not forbidding him to attack but might dismiss him if the assault failed, telegraphed Wilson back that they were a "wretched lot" (Wilson replied that the government were worried about needing to retain troops in the UK because of a police strike) and wrote that attacking the Germans now would be less costly than allowing them time to regroup and consolidate. When the Third and Fourth Armies reached the Hindenburg Line (18 September) Haig received a congratulatory note from Wilson saying "you must be a famous general", to which he replied that he was not (as this would have meant currying favour with Repington and the Northcliffe Press) but "we have a number of very capable generals". Milner visited GHQ, and warned him that manpower would not be available for 1919 if squandered now.

There is some dispute over how much direct operational control Haig maintained at this time, Tim Travers in particular arguing that he allowed his Army Commanders (Plumer, Byng, Horne, Birdwood and Rawlinson) a very free hand, whilst at the same time Ferdinand Foch, whose role had initially been confined to advice and deployment of reserves, was exerting ever-greater influence over strategy. Haig was irritated that Foch insisted that Plumer's Second Army remain part of an Army Group commanded by the King of the Belgians, so that the French and Belgians could take credit for liberating Brussels.

Germany first requested an Armistice after the penetration of the Hindenburg Line at its strongest point, St Quentin/Cambrai, on 28 September, and the almost simultaneous capitulation of Bulgaria, and discussions continued for a month until the ceasefire on 11 November. Haig urged moderation, suggesting that Germany only be asked to give up Belgium and Alsace-Lorraine, and warning that intelligence reports suggested that the German Army was still "far from beaten" (an ironic claim in view of his willingness to pronounce Germany on the verge of defeat in previous years) and that humiliating terms might lead to a militarist backlash. After one set of talks on 21 October Haig suspected Wilson, a staunch Unionist, of wanting to prolong the war as an excuse to subdue southern Ireland by bringing in conscription there. In the end the collapse of Austria-Hungary encouraged the politicians to demand stricter terms (although less strict than Foch or Pershing would have liked) and Germany was required to evacuate the Rhineland as well. However, once Germany had accepted the strict armistice terms, Haig suggested Germany be split into independent states at the peace treaty.

The forces under Haig's command – including Monash's Australian Corps and Currie's Canadian Corps – achieved impressive results: whereas the French, American and Belgian armies combined captured 196,700 prisoners-of-war and 3,775 German guns between 18 July and the end of the war, Haig's forces, with a smaller army than the French, engaged the main mass of the German Army and captured 188,700 prisoners and 2,840 guns – around half of these prisoners were captured by British cavalry. British daily casualty rates (3,645 per day) were heavier during this period than at the Somme (2,950) or Passchendaele (2,121) (but not Arras: 4,070 over a shorter period), because British forces were attacking across the line, instead of being rotated through a single offensive. The military historian, Gary Sheffield, called this, the so-called Hundred Days Offensive, "by far the greatest military victory in British history".

Executions during the First World War

As commander-in-chief, one of Haig's responsibilities was to give the final signature to the death warrants of British and Commonwealth soldiers (but not Australian – these went to the Governor-General of Australia) who had been first sentenced to death by Field General Court Martial. Although the book Shot at Dawn (1983), which began the campaign for pardons, says that it is "quite incorrect" to hold Haig solely responsible, as he was part of a legal process, by the late 1990s Haig was perhaps best known to the general public because of publicity which implied him to be a brutal disciplinarian – this was not the view of contemporaries. Of the 3,080 men sentenced to death in all theatres, 346 were executed, 266 (77%) were for desertion, 37 for murder and 18 for cowardice. Just over 250 of the executions took place during Haig's time as Commander-in-Chief, but only executed men's records survive, so it is hard to comment on the reasons why men were reprieved.

Promotion of army dentistry during the First World War
During the war, Haig suffered from toothache and sent for a Parisian dentist. Consequently, within months the British Army had hired a dozen dentists and, by the end of the war, there were 831. This led to the formation of the Royal Army Dental Corps in 1921.

Later life

After the conclusion of hostilities, Lloyd George arranged a ceremonial reception for Marshal Foch on 1 December; Haig was asked to travel in the fifth carriage with Henry Wilson but not invited to the reception. Feeling that this was a snub and an attempt to win votes for the imminent General Election, Haig declined to attend at all, although he did swallow his dislike of Lloyd George enough to vote for the Coalition. In November 1918 Haig refused Lloyd George's offer of a viscountcy, partly as he felt it was another snub, as his predecessor Sir John French had been awarded the same rank on being removed from command of the BEF, and partly to use his refusal to bargain for better state financial aid for demobilised soldiers, who Henry Wilson told him were amply provided for by charity. Haig held out despite being lobbied by the King, until Lloyd George backed down in March 1919, blaming a recently sacked pensions minister. Haig was created Earl Haig, Viscount Dawick and Baron Haig, of Bemersyde in the County of Berwick, received the thanks of both Houses of Parliament and a grant of £100,000 (his secretary Philip Sassoon had asked for £250,000), to enable him to live in the style appropriate to a senior peer.

In January 1919, disturbances broke out among troops at Calais, as men returning from leave were expected to return to full army discipline and key workers with jobs to go to (who had often been the last to enlist) were – contrary to Haig's advice – given priority for demobilisation. Haig accepted the advice of Winston Churchill, Secretary of State for War, that exercising his right to shoot the ringleaders was not sensible. For much of 1919, Haig served as Commander-in-Chief Home Forces in Great Britain, a key position as a General Strike seemed likely. Haig kept a low profile in this job and insisted the Army be kept in reserve, not used for normal policing. His military career ended in January 1920. Lord Haig arranged for his Dispatches to be published in 1922 as the General Election loomed, although in the end his nemesis Lloyd George was ousted for unrelated reasons.

After retiring from the service, Lord Haig devoted the rest of his life to the welfare of ex-servicemen, making many speeches (which did not come easily to him) and answering all letters in his own hand. Haig pushed for the amalgamation of organisations, quashing a suggestion of a separate organisation for officers, into The British Legion which was founded in June 1921. He visited South Africa in 1921, Newfoundland in 1924, and Canada in 1925 (visits to Australia and New Zealand were being planned when he died) to promote ex-servicemen's interests. He was instrumental in setting up the Haig Fund for the financial assistance of ex-servicemen and the Haig Homes charity to ensure they were properly housed; both continue to provide help many years after they were created.

An avid golf enthusiast, Haig was captain of The Royal and Ancient Golf Club of St Andrews, from 1920 to 1921. He was president of The British Legion until his death and was chairman of the United Services Fund from 1921 until his death.

Lord Haig maintained ties with the British Army after his retirement; he was honorary colonel of the 17th/21st Lancers (having been honorary colonel of the 17th Lancers from 1912), The London Scottish and the King's Own Scottish Borderers. Royal Horse Guards, He was also Lord Rector and later Chancellor of the University of St Andrews.

Death

Haig died at 21 Prince's Gate, London, from a heart attack, aged 66, on 29 January 1928, and was given an elaborate funeral on 3 February. "Great crowds lined the streets ... come to do honour to the chief who had sent thousands to the last sacrifice when duty called for it, but whom his war-worn soldiers loved as their truest advocate and friend." The gun-carriage that carried the Unknown Warrior to his grave and, in active service, had borne the gun that fired the first British shot in the First World War took the field marshal's body from St Columba's Church, Pont Street, London, where it had been lying in state, to Westminster Abbey. Three royal princes followed the gun-carriage and the pall-bearers included two Marshals of France (Foch and Pétain). The cortege was accompanied by five guards of honour at the slow march, with reversed arms and muffled drums: two officers and fifty other ranks from each branch of the British armed forces (Royal Navy, the Irish Guards, and the Royal Air Force); fifty men of the 1st French Army Corps; and 16 men from the Belgian Regiment of Grenadiers. After the service at the Abbey, the procession re-formed to escort the body to Waterloo station for the journey to Edinburgh, where it lay in state for three days at St Giles's Cathedral.

Haig's body was buried at Dryburgh Abbey in the Scottish borders, the grave being marked with a plain stone tablet in the style of the standard headstones of the Imperial War Graves Commission issued to British military casualties in the First World War.

The Earl Haig Memorial, an equestrian statue in Whitehall commissioned by Parliament and sculpted by Alfred Frank Hardiman, aroused some controversy and was not unveiled until just before Armistice Day in 1937.

Reputation

Post-war opinion
After the war Haig was praised by the American General John J. Pershing, who remarked that Haig was "the man who won the war". He was also publicly lauded as the leader of a victorious army. His funeral in 1928 was a huge state occasion. However, after his death he was increasingly criticised for issuing orders which led to excessive casualties of British troops under his command on the Western Front, earning him the nickname "Butcher of the Somme".

Criticism of Haig occurred in the memoirs of politicians. Winston Churchill, whose World Crisis was written during Haig's lifetime, suggested that greater use of tanks, as at Cambrai, could have been an alternative to blocking enemy machine-gun fire with "the breasts of brave men".

Haig sent Churchill extracts from his diaries and commented on drafts, to which Churchill was willing to make amendments. Churchill told Haig (20 November 1926) that he was "a convinced and outspoken opponent to our offensive policy at Loos, on the Somme and at Passchendaele". He thought the Somme "a welter of slaughter which … left the (Allied) armies weaker in relation to the Germans than when it began". Haig thought these views "most mischievous" but was willing to accept criticism of his command, although he argued that decisions he took in August and September 1918 were responsible for the war ending in November.

Churchill also wrote that although the Allied offensives up until August 1918 had been "as hopeless as they were disastrous", requiring men of fifty to be called up because of the manpower shortage, "Haig and Foch were vindicated in the end" and that the Hundred Days "will excite the wonder of future generations." Churchill (23 Nov 1926) admitted to Lord Beaverbrook, who thought him too willing to praise Haig, that "subsequent study of the war has led me to think a good deal better of Haig than I did at the time. It is absolutely certain there was no one who could have taken his place."

Churchill's essay on Haig in Great Contemporaries, written after Haig's death, was slightly more critical, noting the government's refusal to offer Haig employment after 1920, his excessive (in Churchill's view) emphasis on the Western Front and his lack of the "sinister genius" possessed by the truly great generals of history; he was "quite friendly to the tanks", Churchill wrote, but would never have come up with the idea of inventing them himself.

Lloyd George was more critical in his War Memoirs, published in 1936 when Haig was dead and Lloyd George was no longer a major political player. In Chapter 89, he poured scorn on Haig's recently published diaries (clearly "carefully edited" by Duff Cooper) describing Haig as "intellectually and temperamentally unequal to his task" and "second-rate" (compared to Foch, p. 2014), although "above the average for his profession—perhaps more in industry than intelligence". He attributed his own "distrust of his capacity to fill such an immense position" to Haig's lack of a clear grasp even of the Western Front (likening him to "the blind King of Bohemia at Crecy"), let alone the needs of other fronts and his inability, given his preference for being surrounded by courteous "gentlemen", to select good advisers. He also criticised Haig for lacking the personal magnetism of a great commander, for his intrigues against his predecessor Sir John French, his willingness to scapegoat Hubert Gough for the defeat of March 1918 (although he had actually defended him and the alternative would probably have been Haig's own dismissal), and his claims to have subsequently accepted the appointment of Foch as Allied Generalissimo, which Lloyd George claimed that Haig had opposed. On another occasion he is said to have described Haig as "brilliant – to the top of his boots". Lloyd George's biographer John Grigg (2002) attributed his vitriol to a guilty conscience, that he had not intervened to put a stop to the Passchendaele Offensive. John Terraine, writing of the "shrill venom" with which Lloyd George sought to "exculpate himself", also found some "faint stirring of consciousness" of how he had destroyed trust between politicians and soldiers by the Nivelle Affair (making it impossible for Robertson to raise his concerns about the Battle of Passchendaele with the Prime Minister) and called the memoirs "a document as shabby as his behaviour at Calais".

B. H. Liddell Hart, a military historian who had been wounded during the First World War, went from admirer to sceptic to unremitting critic. He wrote in his diary:

Other historians

One of Haig's defenders was the military historian John Terraine, who published a biography of Haig (The Educated Soldier) in 1963, in which Haig was portrayed as a "Great Captain" of the calibre of the Duke of Marlborough or the Duke of Wellington. Terraine, taking his cue from Haig's "Final Despatch" of 1918, also argued that Haig pursued the only strategy possible, given the situation the armies were in: that of attrition which wore down the German army and delivered the coup de grâce of 1918. Gary Sheffield stated that although Terraine's arguments about Haig have been much attacked over forty years, Terraine's thesis "has yet to be demolished".

Australian historian Les Carlyon wrote that while Haig was slow to adapt to the correct use of artillery in sufficient quantities to support infantry attacks and was generally sceptical that the science of such doctrine had much place in military theory, he was fully supportive of excellent corps and field commanders such as Herbert Plumer, Arthur Currie and John Monash, who seem to best grasp and exercise these concepts, especially later in the war. Carlyon also wrote out that there was a case to answer, for his support of more dubious commanders such as Ian Hamilton, Aylmer Hunter-Weston and Hubert Gough.

Tactical developments
Critics, including Alan Clark and Gerard De Groot, argue that Haig failed to appreciate the critical science of artillery or supporting arms and that he was "unimaginative", although de Groot added that he has had the misfortune to be judged by the standards of a later age, in which the cause of Britain and her Empire were no longer thought worthy of such bloodshed. Paul Fussell, a literary historian, wrote in The Great War and Modern Memory that,

although one doesn't want to be too hard on Haig ... who has been well calumniated already ... it must be said that it now appears that one thing the war was testing was the usefulness of the earnest Scottish character in a situation demanding the military equivalent of wit and invention. Haig had none. He was stubborn, self-righteous, inflexible, intolerant—especially of the French—and quite humourless ... Indeed, one powerful legacy of Haig's performance is the conviction among the imaginative and intelligent today of the unredeemable defectiveness of all civil and military leaders. Haig could be said to have established the paradigm.

Military historian John Bourne wrote that this was not the case. Haig, although not familiar with technological advances, encouraged their use. He also rejected claims that Haig was a traditionalist and focused only on cavalry tactics. Cavalry represented less than three percent of the BEF in France by September 1916, whilst the British were the most mechanised force in the world by 1918, supported by the world's largest air force. The Tank Corps was the world's first such force and some 22,000 men served in it during the war. The Royal Artillery grew by 520 percent and the engineers who implemented combined arms tactics grew by 2,212 percent. Bourne wrote that this hardly demonstrates a lack of imagination. Other historians, notably John Keegan, refused to accept that the British Army underwent a "learning curve" of any sort; despite this example, Bourne wrote that there "is little disagreement among scholars about the nature of the military transformation". Popular "media opinion" had failed to grasp that under Haig, the British Army adopted a very modern style of war in 1918, something that was very different from 1914, 1916 and 1917.

There is no consensus on the speed of a learning curve. Tim Travers wrote that there was no one "villain" but the pre-war regular army. Travers blamed the management of early campaigns on the ethos of the pre-war officer corps, which was based on privilege, with a hierarchy intent on self-preservation and maintaining individual reputations. As a consequence the army was poorly positioned to adapt quickly. Travers wrote that initiative was discouraged, making advancement in a learning curve slow and that the ethos of the army was pro-human and anti-technological. The offensive spirit of the infantry, quality of the soldier, rapid rifle-fire and the idea of the soldier being the most important aspect of the battlefield prevailed. The lessons of the Russo-Japanese War and the power of artillery were ignored, which caused costly tactical mistakes in the first half of the war. The tactics that Haig pursued (a breakthrough battle deep into enemy territory) were beyond the mobility and range of artillery, which contributed to operational failures and heavy losses. Travers also criticised Haig and enemy commanders for (in Travers' opinion) seeing battle as perfectly organised and something that could be planned perfectly, ignoring the concept of fog of war and confusion in battle. Travers wrote that top-down command became impossible in the chaos of battle and lower levels of command were relied upon. Owing to the lack of attention at this level in the early years of the war, a command vacuum was created in which GHQ became a spectator.

Bourne considered this to be too harsh. Haig belonged to the lower officer corps of the pre-war army, yet he progressed along with other commanders of the Edwardian era from battalion, brigade, division and corps command, to the army group and commanders-in-chief of the First World War. The advances in operational methods, technology and tactical doctrine were implemented by these officers, Haig among them. Bourne also wrote that it was difficult to reconcile the commanders of 1918 with the dogma-ridden, unprofessional, unreflecting institution depicted by Tim Travers, who did not take into account the year 1918, when the officer corps succeeded in integrating infantry, artillery, armour and aircraft in a war-winning operational method, a process which began on the Somme in 1916 and which would have been impossible, had these Edwardian officers been hostile to change in operational methodology and technological terms.

Biographers Robin Prior and Trevor Wilson, writing in the Oxford Dictionary of National Biography (2004) state that:
As a result of his determination to accomplish great victories Haig too often disregarded key factors such as weather, and the condition of the battlefield, placed his objectives beyond the range which his artillery could cover and incorporated in his schemes a role for cavalry which this arm was helpless to accomplish. These shortcomings, it needs to be stressed, were not at all peculiar to Haig. ... But the outcome, too often, was British operations directed towards unrealizable objectives and persisted in long after they had ceased to serve any worthwhile purpose. The consequence was excessive loss of British lives, insubstantial accomplishment, and waning morale.

Casualties
Haig has been criticised for the high casualties in British offensives, but it has been argued by historians like John Terraine that this was largely a function of the size of the battles, as British forces engaged the main body of the German Army on the Western Front after 1916. Although total deaths in the Second World War were far higher than in the First, British deaths were lower, because Britain fought mainly peripheral campaigns in the Mediterranean for much of the Second World War, involving relatively few British troops, while most of the land fighting took place between Germany and the USSR (which suffered roughly as many dead in the Second World War, not including civilians, as every country in the First World War combined). When British forces engaged in Normandy in 1944, total losses were fewer than on the Somme in 1916, as Normandy was around half the length and less than half the size but casualties per unit per week were broadly similar. David French wrote that British daily loss rates at Normandy, in which divisions lost up to three quarters of their infantry, were similar to those of Passchendaele in 1917, while average battalion casualty rates in 1944–45 (100 men per week) were similar to those of the First World War.

John Terraine wrote:

He also wrote that British perceptions were coloured by the terrible losses of 1 July 1916 (57,000 casualties) but that it should also be remembered that the British never suffered anything like the losses of June 1916, when the Austro-Hungarian Army had 280,000 casualties in a week, or of August 1914 when the French Army lost 211,000 in 16 days, or of March and April 1918 when the Germans lost nearly 350,000 in six weeks (8,600 per day), or 1915 when Russia suffered 2 million casualties in a year.

Total British First World War deaths seemed especially severe as they fell among certain groups such as Pals Battalions (volunteers who enlisted together and were allowed to serve together – and were often killed together) or the alleged "Lost Generation" of public school and university educated junior officers. British deaths, although heavy compared to other British wars, were only around half those of France or Germany as a proportion of the population.

Alleged falsification of records
Denis Winter in his book Haig's Command, wrote that Haig protected his reputation by falsifying his diary, to mislead historians as to his thoughts and intentions. Sheffield and Bourne wrote that all three versions of Haig's diary (the handwritten original, the carbon copy thereof, to which he sometimes made amendments and the version typed up by Lady Haig) have been available in the National Library of Scotland since March 1961. 

Barring a few disputes over contentious meetings, such as the War Council of early August 1914 and the Doullens Conference of March 1918, "the overall authenticity of Haig's diary is, however, not in doubt", not least because of the frequency with which its contents have been used to criticise him and because the facts do not appear to have been distorted, to fit a retrospective interpretation of the war, such as that contained in the "Final Despatch" of 21 March 1919, in which Haig claimed to have delivered final victory, after several years of "wearing-out" (attrition). Dr John Bourne wrote that (given the low regard in which Haig had come to be held by the general public) "Winter's perceived conspiracy would appear to be one of the least successful in history. The falsification of his diary seems equally inept, given the frequency with which its contents are held against the author's competence, integrity and humanity, not least by Winter himself." Bourne and Bond wrote that the critics of Haig tend to ignore the fact that the war was won in 1918.

Winter also wrote that Haig and the British Government had conspired with the Official Historian, Brigadier J. E. Edmonds, to show Haig in a better light in the Official History. These claims were rejected by a number of British and Australian historians, including Robin Prior and Correlli Barnett. Barnett's comments were supported by John Hussey and Dr. Jeffrey Grey of the University of New South Wales, who wrote that:

Donald Cameron Watt found Winter

Winter wrote that Edmonds did not canvass the opinion of veterans, which was untrue – some volumes were sent to 1,000 or more officers for their comments, as well as being checked against unit diaries down to battalion level – in some cases entire chapters were rewritten (or in the case of Passchendaele, the volume was rewritten several times in the 1940s, during disputes about the roles of Haig and Hubert Gough, who was still alive). Winter quoted, out of context, Edmonds' advice to his researchers to write a draft narrative first, then invite interviewees to comment over lunch: Andrew Green, in his study of the Official History, wrote that this was done deliberately, for memories to be jogged by the draft narrative and that senior officers were more likely to be frank if approached informally. Winter doubted that Haig had passed out of Sandhurst top of his year or been awarded the Anson Sword but this was refuted by S. J. Anglim, who consulted the Sandhurst records.

Haig in popular culture
Haig appeared as himself in the films Under Four Flags (1918) and Remembrance (1927).

Journalism and popular history
Haig has commonly been portrayed as an inept commander who exhibited callous disregard for the lives of his soldiers, repeatedly ordering tens of thousands of them to supposedly useless deaths, during battles such as the Battle of Passchendaele  1917). Sometimes the criticism is more against the generation of British generals which he is deemed to represent, a view aired by writers such as John Laffin (British Butchers and Bunglers of World War One) and John Mosier (Myth of the Great War). Alan Clark's book The Donkeys (1961) led to the popularisation of the controversial phrase 'lions led by donkeys', which was used to describe British generalship. Clark attributed this remark to the German generals Max Hoffmann and Erich Ludendorff but later admitted that he lied. A critical biographer finds "no evidence of widespread contempt for Haig; the claim that ordinary soldiers universally thought him a butcher does not accord with their continued willingness to fight".

Drama and literature
Haig was played by Sir John Mills in the 1969 film, Oh! What a Lovely War, in which much of the dialogue is taken from Clark's The Donkeys. He is portrayed as being indifferent to the fate of the troops under his command, his goal being to wear the Germans down even at the cost of enormous losses and to prevail, since the Allies will have the last 10,000 men left. Gary Sheffield notes that although the film said more about 1960s attitudes than it did about the war, it helped to shape popular memory of the war, being "much quoted, alluded to and parodied".

In the 1989 BBC comedy series Blackadder Goes Forth, Haig, played by Geoffrey Palmer, makes an appearance in the final episode. Referring to the limited gains made during the 1915–1917 offensives, Blackadder says: "Haig is about to make yet another gargantuan effort to move his drinks cabinet six inches closer to Berlin". Haig is also portrayed sweeping up model soldiers from a large map with a dustpan and brush, and tossing them casually over his shoulder.

In the 1985 Australian television mini-series Anzacs, Haig was played by actor Noel Trevarthen and the series included scenes featuring meetings between Haig and prominent Australian journalist Keith Murdoch, the father of News Corp. CEO and Chairman Rupert Murdoch. Haig was portrayed as a cold and aloof man whose scepticism about the fighting abilities of the Australian and New Zealand troops arriving on the Western Front in 1916 was aggravated by the conduct of the Australians behind the lines. The series also portrayed British Prime Minister Lloyd George having a strong dislike of Haig and wishing to see him removed from command in 1917.

Honours
The following table shows the honours awarded to Haig:

Honorary degrees
Haig received many honorary degrees from universities, including:

 Honorary degrees

Freedom of the City
British Empire
  26 January 1912: Bradford
  15 May 1919: Dundee
  16 June 1919: London
  25 June 1919: Oxford
  16 October 1919: Wolverhampton
  23 January 1920: Leeds
  14 October 1922: Stirling
  Date Unknown: Glasgow

Legacy
The Argentine football club Club Atlético Douglas Haig, founded in 1918, is named after Haig. 

In the early 1920s, several years before his death, a new road of council houses in Kates Hill, Dudley, Worcestershire (now West Midlands) was named Haig Road in honour of Haig. 

In August 1920, the Great Central Railway gave the name Earl Haig to one of their newly built 4-6-0 express passenger locomotives, no. 1166 of class 9P (LNER class B3). It carried the name until October 1943. 

In 1921, Ash Lane in Southport, Merseyside and the football ground of Southport F.C. that was situated there, were both renamed as Haig Avenue in his honour. Earl Haig Secondary School in Toronto was also named after Haig. A species of cottage tulip, "Marshal Haig" with purple flowers, is also named after him. The Hundred of Haig, a cadastral unit in the Australian state of South Australia was named after Haig in 1918. In the late 1920s, Haig Avenue in Mount Roskill, Auckland, was named in his honour.

In Singapore, there is a road named Haig Road in Katong which is named after him.

See also
 Role of Douglas Haig in 1918

Footnotes

Sources

Further reading

Non-biographical

Biographies
 
  Link
  Link
  Link
  Link

External links

 
 
 Liddell Hart Centre for Military Archives. (Retrieved 30 March 2006.)
 Douglas Haig, 1st Earl Haig (1861–1928), Field Marshal: Sitter in 41 portraits (National Portrait Gallery)
 Bob Bushaway Haig and the Cavalry Journal of the Centre for First World War Studies
 GALASHIELS WAR MEMORIAL (1925) (archive film of Field Marshal Earl Haig from the National Library of Scotland: SCOTTISH SCREEN ARCHIVE)
 SCOTLAND ON SCREEN (Earl Haig Unveils Peebles War Memorial (1922) – archive film and learning resources)
 Haig's signature for a book about the New Zealand Division
 Europeana Collections 1914–1918 makes 425,000 First World War items from European libraries available online, including Haig's 'Order of the Day' and other manuscripts, official documents and photographs relating to Haig
 

|-

|-

|-

|-

|-

|-

|-

 
1861 births
1928 deaths
7th Queen's Own Hussars officers
17th Lancers officers
17th/21st Lancers officers
King's Own Scottish Borderers officers
Military personnel from Edinburgh
Alumni of Brasenose College, Oxford
British field marshals
British Army personnel of the Mahdist War
British Army personnel of the Second Boer War
British Army cavalry generals of World War I
Chancellors of the University of St Andrews
Earls in the Peerage of the United Kingdom
Graduates of the Royal Military College, Sandhurst
Graduates of the Staff College, Camberley
Knights Commander of the Order of the Indian Empire
Knights Grand Cross of the Order of the Bath
Knights Grand Cross of the Royal Victorian Order
Knights of the Thistle
People educated at Clifton College
Rectors of the University of St Andrews
Scottish generals
Scottish Presbyterians
Royal Horse Guards officers
Members of the Order of Merit
Recipients of the Croix de guerre (Belgium)
Grand Croix of the Légion d'honneur
Recipients of the Croix de Guerre 1914–1918 (France)
Knights Grand Cross of the Order of Saints Maurice and Lazarus
Foreign recipients of the Distinguished Service Medal (United States)
Recipients of the Order of the Rising Sun with Paulownia Flowers
Recipients of the Order of Michael the Brave, 1st class
Douglas Haig, 1st Earl Haig
The Royal British Legion
People educated at Edinburgh Collegiate School
Scottish Freemasons
Peers created by George V
Recipients of the Distinguished Service Medal (US Army)
People of the National Rifle Association